Léon Poncelet (1 March 1885 – 10 November 1978) was a Belgian racing cyclist. He rode in the 1922 Tour de France.

References

1885 births
1978 deaths
Belgian male cyclists
Place of birth missing